"Adieu monsieur le professeur" ("Goodbye, Mr. Professor") is a 1968 song recorded by French singer Hugues Aufray. The song was written and the music composed by Jean-Pierre Bourtayre, Vline Buggy and the singer himself, and was later included in 2007 on Aufray's best of Les 50 plus belles chansons. Contestants from season 4 of the French music talent show Star Academy covered the song in 2004, achieving success.

Song information
In France, the song was notably covered by Star Academy 4 in 2004. Released on December 13, 2004, as third single from the album Les Meilleurs Moments, on which it features as second track in both singing and instrumental versions, the song had success in France and Belgium (Wallonia) where it was a top ten hit. It appears on many French compilations such as Hits For Teens, Hits Superstars 2005, Only Hits 2005 and La Saga des hits, and was included on the charity album Solidarité Asie. Oscar Sisto, the TV reality show's teacher of theater, features in the music video for the song. Nine of the contestants participated in the vocals.

In France, the single went to number 88 on December 5, 2004, then climbed to number 6, then to number 2 and eventually topped the chart for a sole week. It then dropped every week and totaled six weeks in the top ten, 12 weeks in the top 50 and 18 weeks on the chart (top 100). The song was less successful in Belgium: it entered the chart at number 22 on December 25, 2004, then entered the top ten in which it remained for five weeks, with a peak at number 7 in its third week. It fell off the chart (top 40) after 11 weeks.

Track listings
 CD single
 "Adieu monsieur le professeur" — 3:57
 "Les Matins d'hiver" — 3:15
 "Adieu monsieur le professeur" (instrumental) — 3:57

Charts

References

Songs about educators
Songs about parting
2004 singles
SNEP Top Singles number-one singles
Star Academy France songs
Music videos directed by Xavier Gens
1968 songs
Mercury Records singles
Songs written by Jean-Pierre Bourtayre
Songs written by Vline Buggy
Songs written by Hugues Aufray